Attack on the Indian embassy in Kabul can refer to:

 2008 Indian embassy bombing in Kabul
 2009 Kabul Indian embassy attack